Good Riddance / Ensign is a split EP by the hardcore punk bands Good Riddance and the Ensign, released in 1997 through Orphaned Records. Good Riddance's "What We Have" was one of seven songs that had been demoed for their second album A Comprehensive Guide to Moderne Rebellion but had been left off the record; they were recorded in a separate session from the album, with Andy Ernst at Art of Ears, and used on split EPs with Reliance, Ignite, Ill Repute, and Ensign over the following year. Their second track, "Salt", also appeared on their third album Ballads from the Revolution in 1998.

Reflecting on "What We Have", Good Riddance singer Russ Rankin remarked that "Lyrically it's like if you looked up 'generic hardcore  song' in the dictionary it would have this tune next to it. Plenty about friends and music and heart and all the things that made mid to late 1990s hardcore so fun but also so uninteresting."

Track listing

Personnel

Good Riddance 
 Russ Rankin – vocals
 Luke Pabich – guitar
 Chuck Platt – bass guitar
 Sean Sellers – drums

Production 
 Andy Earnst – recording and mix engineer (Side A)

References 

Good Riddance (band) EPs
Ensign (band) EPs
1997 EPs